The 2015 Tour de France was the 102nd edition of the race, one of cycling's Grand Tours. The race took place from 4 July to 26 July 2015, starting in Utrecht in the Netherlands and finishing on the Champs-Élysées in Paris.

All seventeen UCI WorldTeams were automatically invited and were obliged to attend the race. In January 2015, five UCI Professional Continental teams were given wildcard places into the race by the race organisers – Amaury Sport Organisation (ASO) – to complete the 22-team peloton. As each team was entitled to enter nine riders, the peloton on the first stage consisted of 198 riders. These came from 32 countries. 41 riders – approximately a fifth of the peloton – were French; no other nation had more than 20 riders in the race. Merhawi Kudus and Daniel Teklehaimanot were the first ever Eritrean riders to participate in the Tour.

160 riders completed the final stage in Paris, with 38 of the riders failing to finish the race. The race was won by Chris Froome, the champion from the 2013 Tour. Froome first took the lead of the race following the third stage – the first uphill finish of the race. He lost the yellow jersey of the race leader to Tony Martin at the end of the fourth stage, but Martin's withdrawal from the race after a crash at the end of the sixth stage put Froome back into the lead. He extended this lead during the stages in the Pyrenees and defended it successfully against attacks from Nairo Quintana during the final stages that took place in the Alps. Quintana finished second, 1 minute and 12 seconds behind Froome, with Quintana's teammate Alejandro Valverde in third. Quintana won the competition for the best young rider. The points classification was won for the fourth consecutive year by Peter Sagan, although he failed to win any stages during the race. As well as winning the general classification, Froome won the mountains classification, while Movistar won the team classification.

Teams

The 17 UCI WorldTeams were automatically invited to participate in the Tour. In addition, Amaury Sport Organisation (ASO), the race organisers, invited five wildcard teams. Three of the teams (and ) were prominent French teams. The race director, Christian Prudhomme, pointed to Europcar's strength as a team and the presence of several prominent French riders and to Cofidis's Nacer Bouhanni as reasons for their inclusion. He also recalled 's performance in 2014 and the team's base in Brittany, a region used by the 2015 race.  had also performed strongly in 2014 and, as a German-based team, their presence was important as ASO had recently signed a new broadcast agreement with ARD, a German broadcaster. Prudhomme explained that their invitation was part of ASO's strategy to build cycling's popularity in Africa.

 UCI WorldTeams

  (riders)
  (riders)
  (riders)
  (riders)
  (riders)
  (riders)
  (riders)
  (riders)
  (riders)
  (riders)
  (riders)
  (riders)
  (riders)
  (riders)
  (riders)
  (riders)
  (riders)

UCI Professional Continental teams

  (riders)
  (riders)
  (riders)
  (riders)
  (riders)

Cyclists

By starting number

By team

By nationality
The 198 riders that competed in the 2015 Tour de France represented 32 different countries. Riders from nine countries won stages during the race; German riders won the largest number of stages.

References

Sources

External links

2015 Tour de France
2015